Achada Monte is a town in the northern part of the island of Santiago, Cape Verde and is part of the municipality of São Miguel. It is situated near the east coast, 8 km northwest of Calheta de São Miguel. In 2010 its population was 1,652. It is on the road connecting Praia and Tarrafal through Pedra Badejo, the EN1-ST02. The small bay Mangue de Sete Ribeiras is located east of the settlement. Ribeira Principal flows west of the village.

References

Geography of Santiago, Cape Verde
Populated coastal places in Cape Verde
São Miguel, Cape Verde
Towns in Cape Verde